is a junction passenger railway station located in the city of Izumisano, Osaka Prefecture, Japan, operated by the private railway operator Nankai Electric Railway. It has station number "NK30".

Lines
It is also the terminus of the  Nankai Airport Line to Kansai International Airport. the Nankai Airport Line, and is numbered .

Layout
The station consists of three elevated island platforms serving a total of four tracks. The center platform is used for getting off and changing trains from the northbound trains to the southbound ones, and is closed after 24:00.

Platforms

Adjacent stations

History
The station name was changed to its present name on 1 April 1948.

Passenger statistics
In fiscal 2019, the station was used by an average of 24,520 passengers daily.

Surrounding area
 Izumisano City Hall
 Izumisano City Cultural Center
 Osaka Prefectural Sano High School of Technology
 Osaka Prefectural Sano High School

See also
 List of railway stations in Japan

References

External links

 

Railway stations in Japan opened in 1897
Railway stations in Osaka Prefecture
Izumisano